Brazilian vehicle registration plates are issued by the states. Each state has a Departamento de Trânsito (DETRAN) that is in charge of vehicle registration and car tax collection, but plates are standardized across the country and form a national vehicle registration database.

Description
The current system, being phased out in favor of Mercosul standard plates, was created in 1990 and was named Registro Nacional de Veículos Automotores (RENAVAM). It uses the form "LLL·NNNN", where LLL is a three-letter combination followed by a four-digit number with a dot between the letters and numbers. A combination given to one vehicle stays with it "for life" - it cannot be changed or transferred to another vehicle. Vanity plates are allowed as long as they abide by the same standard as non-vanity plates.

Above the combination is a metallic band with the standardized state abbreviation and the name of the municipality in which the vehicle is currently registered. This band has to be changed when a vehicle needs to be registered in a different municipality. 
Rear number plates are bound to the vehicle by a plastic seal. Broken seals invalidate the number plate, which has to be re-sealed by the authorities. Seals need to be broken in order to change State/Municipality tags.

The size of the Brazilian license plates has been standardized to 400 × 130 mm (15" × 5" approx.) in 2008. That standardization also requires a unique typeface known as "Mandatory", which is similar to the typeface used on British plates introduced there in 2001. Plates in North American standard or European standard size can no longer be used as of 1 January 2008.

Colors

Mercosur license plates (2018-)
 Black on white: privately owned vehicles;
 Red on white: any kind of paid transportation (buses, taxis, trucks, etc.) and driving schools (autoescola in Portuguese);
 Blue on white: official use (government-owned cars: police departments, fire departments, federal, state or city public services);
 Grey on white: collector's items (vehicles older than 30 years in excellent state of conservation and in original state - with more than 80% of its original components), unrestricted circulation inside and outside Brazil;
 White on black: same as above, but without Mercosur's logo and with circulation restricted inside Brazil;
 Green on white: manufacturer plates for vehicles under testing, dealer-testing, or in some cases test-drive (in most cases test-drive cars are registered to the dealership and thus use regular black on white plates; privately owned cars being tested after repairs usually carry dealer-fitted green plates over their black on white plates);
 Gold on white: diplomatic use.

Old system (1990-2018)
 Black on grey: privately owned vehicles;
 White on red: any kind of paid transportation (buses, taxis etc.);
 Red on white: driving school (autoescola in Portuguese);
 Black on white: official use (government-owned cars: police departments, fire departments, federal, state or city public services);
 Gray on black: collector's items (vehicles older than 30 years in excellent state of conservation and in original state - with more than 80% of its original components);
 White on green: manufacturer plates for vehicles under testing, dealer-testing, or in some cases test-drive (in most cases test-drive cars are registered to the dealership and thus use black on grey plates; privately owned cars being tested after repairs usually carry dealer-fitted green plates over their black on grey plates);
 White on blue: diplomatic use (in this case in the format CD 1234 or CC 1234) or newer licenses like EMB 1234).

Letters

The letters on the license plate can describe the state where a vehicle was originally registered. Vehicles relocated from one state to another will show the new state/municipality on the replaceable tag, but it is always possible to determine the place of original registration for a used vehicle by observing the license plate range for each Brazilian State: 

Below is an alphabetically organized list of Letter Sequences and corresponding States. This list is up to date as of September 2022.

2018 Mercosur standard

In October 2014 the design of the new license plate to be used by all Mercosul countries was officially presented. The typeface used is FE-Schrift.

In September, 2018, Mercosul standard license plates started to be adopted in Rio de Janeiro. As of January 2020, all states have started issuing the new plates. By the end of 2023, all vehicles are expected to be carrying these new plates.

The Mercosul license plates have a new alphanumeric format that will allow for more available combinations. While the previous system used a LLL-#### format, the new format is LLL#L##. Vehicles who are to switch their old license plates for the new one will retain their previous license plate number, with the exception of the 2nd digit (5th character). The number in that position of the alphanumberic format is being replaced by a letter, in accordance with the below table.

References

Brazil
Road transport in Brazil
Brazil transport-related lists
 Registration plates